Pachygnatha sundevalli is a spider species in the family Tetragnathidae, found in Portugal and Spain.

See also 
 List of Tetragnathidae species

References

External links 

Tetragnathidae
Spiders of Europe
Spiders described in 1973